The V Sixth Avenue Local was a rapid transit service in the B Division of the New York City Subway. Its route emblem, or "bullet", was colored  since it used the IND Sixth Avenue Line in Manhattan.

The V operated weekdays only from approximately 6:30 a.m. to midnight between 71st Avenue in Forest Hills, Queens and Second Avenue, near the border of the East Village and the Lower East Side, Manhattan.

Except for a brief period in early 2005, the V had the same service pattern during its eight-and-a-half-year history. As part of a series of service reductions to close a budget gap, the V train was eliminated on June 25, 2010. With the exception of service at Second Avenue, it was combined with the  train, which was rerouted from Lower Manhattan and South Brooklyn via the Chrystie Street Connection.

Service history

Former use 
Originally, the V was used to indicate provisional routes running on the IND Sixth Avenue Line; older rollsigns had the orange V emblem with the text "via 6 Avenue" as a provisional service if ever needed.

Initial service plan 
The V was originally conceived as a Sixth Avenue extra since the early 1980s, running via 63rd Street. It appeared as an orange bullet on rollsigns. The V also appeared on the digital signs of the R44s and R46s with any route and designation combination that could be used for the Sixth Avenue Line. On May 31, 2001, the MTA Board approved the operating plan for the opening of the 63rd Street Connector, including the beginning of V service, which was to begin on November 11, 2001.

The V made its debut on December 17, 2001. Service ran every six minutes during rush hours, running southbound from 71st Avenue between 5:38 a.m. and 10:57 p.m., and northbound from Second Avenue between 5:54 a.m. and 11:33 p.m..

It was introduced to provide riders at local stations along the IND Queens Boulevard Line with direct service to Manhattan via the IND Sixth Avenue Line, and to resolve overcrowding issues at 23rd Street–Ely Avenue. The V service added nine additional peak-hour trains coming into Manhattan from Queens Boulevard. However, to make room for V trains on Queens Boulevard, the  train was cut back to a new weekday terminal at Long Island City–Court Square and the  train was rerouted via the 63rd Street Connector.

To prepare for this service, rush hour service was simulated twice on Saturdays during the previous spring. The first time, the V, labeled as S, ran via 63rd Street, the F ran via 53rd Street, and the G ran to 179th Street. It was particularly done to see if it was possible to maintain existing G train service along Queens Boulevard with the new V train added on. When this test became unsuccessful, the V's eventual service pattern (via 53rd Street) was tested on September 8, and was a success. Due to the September 11 attacks and numerous services being disrupted by damage sustained in the attacks (including R service along Queens Boulevard), the V train's entry into service was delayed for 3 months.

Controversy 

The new service plan was designed to redistribute Queens-bound passenger loads along the heavily used IND Sixth Avenue Line by encouraging use of the additional local trains provided for shorter trips, and to improve service and transfer opportunities for passengers using local stations along Queens Boulevard. The New York Times described the service plan as "complex and heavily criticized." New York Times columnist Randy Kennedy wrote that four months after it opened, the service was operating at only 49% of capacity. Several years experience with the service running, has shown its value and seen further gains. V trains, while by no means consistently full, have taken some load off the  train; however, some riders have complained that the passenger load on the  train has worsened, while others said it has gotten better, due to its becoming the only express train that runs along 53rd Street. The overcrowding on the E train was, in part, due to riders' propensity to board an express even in situations where it offers no real advantage in travel time over the local. Conductors were asked to make scripted announcements to urge riders to use the V, noting that they had a better chance of getting a seat on the train. By May 2002, ridership started picking up on the V, and crowding on the E was reduced from 115% of capacity during rush hours to 96%.

Not all  riders were happy. Columnist Kennedy sought out and interviewed some who were not happy with the V's debut:

On January 23, 2005, a fire destroyed the signal room of Chambers Street on the IND Eighth Avenue Line. V service was temporarily extended to Euclid Avenue until  service was restored on February 2.

Merger of V and M trains 

In late 2009, the MTA confronted a financial crisis, and many of the same service cuts threatened just months earlier during a previous budget crisis were revisited. One of the proposals included completely phasing out  service and using the V as its replacement. Under this proposal, the V would no longer serve its southern terminus at Lower East Side–Second Avenue. Instead, after leaving Broadway–Lafayette Street, it would use the Chrystie Street Connection, a then-unused track connection between the BMT Nassau Street Line and the IND Sixth Avenue Line, and stop at Essex Street in Manhattan before serving all M stations to Metropolitan Avenue in Queens.

The MTA determined that this move, while still a service cut, would actually benefit M riders, as approximately 17,000 of them traveled to its stations in Lower Manhattan, whereas 22,000 transferred to other lines to reach destinations in Midtown Manhattan. Additionally, this merger would open up new travel options for northern Brooklyn and Queens  riders, in that it would allow direct and more convenient access to areas that were not served by those routes before such as Midtown Manhattan.

On March 19, 2010, it was decided that the new service pattern would retain the M designation instead, which would now be designated with an orange symbol representing an IND Sixth Avenue Line train, while the V designation will be discontinued. Many MTA board members had opposed the elimination of the M designation, saying that riders would be more comfortable with an M designation rather than a V designation, and because the M has been around longer than the V.

The V ceased operation on Friday, June 25, 2010, with the last train bound for Forest Hills–71st Avenue leaving Lower East Side–Second Avenue at 11:33 p.m. Official M service via the Chrystie Street Connection began on Monday, June 28, 2010.

From July 3, 2017, until April 27, 2018, reconstruction work on the BMT Myrtle Avenue Line resulted in a limited number of M trains operating between 71st Avenue in Queens and Second Avenue in Manhattan, during rush hours, replicating the V train's original routing prior to its discontinuation.

Final route

Lines used 

The following lines were used by the V from December 2001 to June 2010:

Stations 

For a more detailed station listing, see the articles on the lines listed above.

References

External links 

 
 V Train Timetable (2006)

Defunct New York City Subway services